Sol Seppy is the stage name of Sophie Michalitsianos (born December 31, 1980), an English singer, songwriter and musician.

Biography 
Michalitsianos was born in Wimbledon, England and grew up in Australia and Greece. After studying piano and cello, she studied contemporary composition and orchestra at the Sydney Conservatorium of Music. At the age of 23, Michalitsianos moved to the United States at the invitation of Mark Linkous, where she performed on the albums Good Morning Spider and It's a Wonderful Life by his indie rock band Sparklehorse. After her time with Sparklehorse, Michalitsianos moved to Upstate New York, where she set up her own studio.  Though the studio and almost all her compositions were destroyed in an explosion, Michalitsianos herself was not harmed.

On April 10, 2006, she released her debut album The Bells of 1 2 on Grönland Records/Rough Trade. Michalitsianos wrote, sang, played and produced all 12 tracks on the album herself. The track "Enter One" was featured in several films and TV shows: Standoff, Son of a Gun, Dark (season 1, episode 6), Final Space (season 1, episode 6), 9-1-1: Lone Star (season 3, episode 2) and Ideal (season 4, episode 8).
On March 1, 2012, the EP The Bird Calls, and Its Song Awakens the Air, and I Call was released first on iTunes and later also in FLAC format. The EP is no longer available on Grönland Records but only as an online download.

Michalitsianos lives in New York.

Discography

Albums 
 2006: The Bells of 1 2
 2006: Pssscheeow
 2018: I Am as You Are
 2020: I.A.A.Y.A Part One

Singles 
 2006: "Move"
 2006: "Slo Fuzz"
 2006: "Supermarket Sweep"
 2012: A Bird Calls and Its Song Awakens the Air, and I Call

References

External links 
 Official page Sol Seppy
 
 
 

1980 births
Living people
English women singer-songwriters
English women in electronic music
English record producers
British women record producers
English expatriates in Australia
English expatriates in Greece
English emigrants to the United States
Songwriters from New York (state)
Grönland Records artists
Rough Trade Records artists
21st-century English women singers
21st-century English singers